Penny and the Pownall Case is a 1948 British second feature mystery film, directed by Slim Hand and starring Ralph Michael, Peggy Evans, Diana Dors and Christopher Lee.

It was the first featured role for Diana Dors, the second female lead, and Christopher Lee, the villain. The two of them, and star Peggy Evans, were members of Rank's "Charm School", The Company of Youth.

The music was by Elisabeth Lutyens, making her the first female British composer to score a feature film.

Premise
A model helps a Scotland Yard detective to hunt down a gang of criminals smuggling Nazi war criminals out of Europe. Cartoonist Jonathan Blair hides secret messages in his comic strips.

Cast
 Ralph Michael - Michael Carson 
 Peggy Evans - Penny Justin 
 Diana Dors - Molly James 
 Christopher Lee - Jonathan Blair 
 Frederick Piper - Policeman 
 Olaf Pooley - Von Leicher 
 Ethel Coleridge - Mrs. Hodgson 
 Sam Costa - Reception Clerk 
 Dennis Vance - Crawford 
 Shaun Noble - Pownall 
 John Lorrell - Fraser 
 Philip Saville - Police Car Driver 
 Peter Madren - Adams 
 Duncan Carse - Boatman

Production
It was the first film made by Highbury Productions, a company that belonged to the Rank Group of companies. Its aim was to make 50 minute "curtain raisers" for Rank's features.

According to Christopher Lee, "only the technicians, working with a grim sense of purpose, were pros in the proper sense. Everybody other function, from direction to walk on parts, was up for grabs." Director Slim Hand was normally a production manager at Ealing.

Reception
Bob Monkhouse wrote in his memoirs that when he saw the film in the cinema he thought it was "really bad" but was impressed by Diana Dors. "It was her energy that at first attracted me," he wrote. "Her acting was raw but promising and her vitality made me remember her afterwards as if her part of the screen had been in colour." Filmink said the "film was the first of many occasions where Dors would outshine the female lead, and make one wonder why she did not get a bigger part."

Christopher Lee called it "a truly grisly free for all"... a "Z feature". He says the cast were forced to watch the film being previewed and he found the experience extremely embarrassing. It was the first time he died on screen.

Notes

References

External links

Peggy and the Pownall Case at BFI
Peggy and the Pownall Case at TCMDB
Penny and the Pownall Case at BFI Screenonline

1948 films
British mystery films
1948 mystery films
British black-and-white films
Films about comics
Films scored by Elisabeth Lutyens
1940s English-language films
1940s British films